David Hay Dalrymple  was an Australian pastoralist, chemist/druggist, and politician in Queensland, Australia. He was a Mayor of Mackay and a Member of the Queensland Legislative Assembly.

Early life 
Dalrymple was born on 14 December 1840 in Newbury, Berkshire, England, the son of James Dalrymple and his wife Georgina (née Hay). He was educated at the Independent College in Taunton and attended lectures at the Bristol Medical School.

Dalrymple arrived in Mackay in 1863.  He was married to Euphemia Margaret McLean in Mackay on 23 Dec 1880 and had two sons and two daughters.  He was a pastoralist, chemist and druggist.

Politics 
Dalrymple served on community boards and served as the Mayor of Mackay from 1869 to 1871 and again in 1873–1874.

He was a Member of the Queensland Legislative Assembly for Mackay from 5 May 1888 to 27 August 1904.

Later life 
Dalrymple died from heart failure in his sleep at his residence Dalry at Crescent Road, Hamilton, Brisbane, Queensland on 1 September 1912. He was buried in Toowong Cemetery on 2 September 2017. Flags were flown at half-mast in Mackay as a mark of respect.

References

Members of the Queensland Legislative Assembly
1840 births
1912 deaths
Burials at Toowong Cemetery
British emigrants to Australia